The British film industry produced over five hundred feature films in 2012. This article fully lists all non-pornographic films, including short films, that had a release date in that year and which were at least partly made by the United Kingdom. It does not include films first released in previous years that had release dates in 2012.   Also included is an overview of the major events in British film, including film festivals and awards ceremonies, as well as lists of those films that have been particularly well received, both critically and financially. The year was particularly notable for a number of British co-produced films from countries with less established film industries, such as Captive (with the Philippines), Mekong Hotel (with Thailand), Comrade Kim Goes Flying (with North Korea) and The Patience Stone (with Afghanistan).

Major releases

January – March

April – June

July – September

October – December

Minor releases

{| class="wikitable sortable plainrowheaders"
|+ "align=bottom" |
|- style="background:#b0e0e6; text-align:center;"
! style="width:25%;"| Title
! style="width:25%;"| Director
! style="width:30%;"| Release date
! style="width:10%;"| Genre
|-
|8 Minutes Idle
|| Mark Simon Hewis
|| 14 February 2014 (UK)
|| Comedy
|-
|Acceptance
|| Richard John Taylor
|| 27 October 2012 (UK)
|| Drama
|-
|Across the River
|| Warren B. Malone
|| 
|| Comedy
|-
|Acts of Godfrey
|| Johnny Daukes
|| 27 January 2012 (UK)
|| Drama
|-
|The Adored
|| Carl Medland
|| 14 April 2012 (Poland)
|| Drama
|-
|After Death
|| Martin Gooch
|| 21 January 2014 (USA)
|| Comedy
|-
|Al Murray: The Only Way Is Epic Tour
|| Al Murray
|| November 2012 (UK)
|| Comedy
|-
|All the Fear of the Fair
|| Chris Jupp
|| March 2012 (UK)
|| Horror
|-
|All's Well That Ends Well
|| John Dove
|| 26 September 2012 (UK)
|| Comedy
|-
|Alpha Protocol: Solomon's Stele
|| Chuka Ibeachum
|| 24 December 2012 (UK)
|| Action
|-
|Amina
|| Christian Ashaiku
|| 
|| Drama
|-
|Anda Union
|| Sophie Lascelles
|| 
|| Musical
|-
|Angelina Ballerina: Dreams Do Come True
|| Charlotte Spencer
|| August 2012 (USA)
|| 
|-
|Angelina Ballerina: Sweet Valentine
|| Charlotte Spencer
|| January 2012 (USA)
||
|-
|Apples
|| Robin Sheppard
||
||
|-
|Arsenal: Season Review 2011/12
|| Alex Song
|| 25 June 2012 (UK)
|| Sport
|-
|Art of Darkness
|| Steve Laurence
|| 5 December 2014 (UK)
|| Horror
|-
|As the Earth Turned
|| Bill Taylor
|| 31 July 2012 (UK)
|| Comedy
|-
|The Assemblies
|| Vaughan Pilikian
|| 1 December 2012 (UK)
||
|-
|Avise la fin
|| Danny Cotton
|| 9 May 2012 (UK)
|| Drama
|-
|Awesome Adventures: Thrills and Chills Vol. 3
|| 
|| September 2012 (USA)
||
|-
|Awesome Killer Audition
|| Philip Gardiner
|| 1 August 2012 (UK)
|| Thriller
|-
|Axed
|| Ryan Lee Driscoll
|| 15 May 2012 (France)
|| Drama
|-
|The Bad Samaritan Must Die!
|| Andrew Leckonby
|| 
|| Crime
|-
|Battlefield Death Tales
|| James Eaves
|| 13 August 2012 (UK)
|| Horror
|-
|Baudelaire's Women
|| Stephen Southouse
|| 1 October 2012 (UK)
|| Drama
|-
|Beggars' Teeth
|| Stephen Woods
|| 26 February 2012 (UK)
|| Drama
|-
|Belle du Seigneur
|| Glenio Bonder
|| 5 June 2013 (France)
|| Drama
|-
|Benny Loves Killing
|| Ben Woodiwiss
||
|| Drama
|-
|Bert & Dickie
|| David Blair
|| 25 July 2012 (USA)
|| Drama
|-
|Betsy & Leonard
|| Bernhard Pucher
|| 
|| Drama
|-
|The Bible in Vision
|| David Cohen
|| 26 March 2012 (UK)
|| Historical
|-
|The Big Match: Tottenham Hotspur Volume 2
|| 
|| 19 November 2012 (UK)
|| Sport
|-
|The Biggest Thing That Ever Hit Broadway
|| Marcus Thompson
|| 1 May 2012 (UK)
|| Musical
|-
|Black Smoke Rising
|| Drew Cullingham
|| 30 September 2012 (UK)
|| Drama
|-
|Blanc
|| Robert Nc Thomas
|| 11 January 2012 (UK)
|| Crime
|-
|Blood and Bone China
|| Chris Stone
|| 10 February 2012 (UK)
|| Horror
|-
|Bloody Lip
|| Adriel Leff
|| 
|| Comedy
|-
|Blueman
|| André Kuenzy
|| 29 February 2012 (Sweden)
|| Comedy
|-
|Borrowed Time
|| Jules Bishop
|| 13 September 2013 (UK)
||
|-
|Boxing Day
|| Bernard Rose
|| 21 December 2012 (UK)
|| Drama
|-
|The Boyfriend
|| Jay Cosme
|| 27 February 2012 (UK)
|| Drama
|-
|Broken
|| Scott M. Holden
|| 12 October 2012 (USA)
|| Drama
|-
|The Bubonic Play
|| Cal McCrystal
|| 
|| Comedy
|-
|The Bullseye Killer
|| Greg Lewis
|| 1 January 2012 (UK)
|| News
|-
|Call of Babylon
|| Graeme Noble
|| 
|| Action
|-
|Candle to Water
|| Nihat Seven
|| 1 November 2012 (UK)
|| Drama
|-
|Capsule
|| Eddie Saint-Jean
||
|| Drama
|-
|Cardiff City Road to Wembley 2012
|| 
|| 10 April 2012 (UK)
|| Sport
|-
|The Casebook of Eddie Brewer
|| Andrew Spencer
|| 18 March 2012 (UK)
|| Drama
|-
|Cash 'n' Paisa
|| Khoram Hedayati
|| 
|| Drama
|-
|Cassette
|| David Paul Irons
||
|| Drama
|-
|Casting
|| Gabriel Henrique Gonzalez
|| 2012 (UK)
|| Comedy
|-
|Chakan the Forever Man
|| Robin Morningstar
|| 4 May 2012 (UK)
|| Fantasy
|-
|Chases and Fun Awesome Adventures Vol. Two: Races
|| Michael Brandon
|| June 2012 (USA)
||
|-
|Chasing the Bear
|| Ted Byron Baybutt
||
|| Adventure
|-
|Chérie Bondowe
|| Ne Kunda Nlaba Kunda
|| 
|| Drama
|-
|Chinese Burns
|| Alan Ronald
|| 2012 (UK)
|| Drama
|-
|Citadel
|| Ciarán Foy
|| 1 March 2013 (UK)
|| Drama
|-
|City of Fear
|| Callum Rees
|| 1 March 2012 (UK)
|| Drama
|-
|City Slacker
|| James Larkin
|| 5 October 2012 (UK)
|| Romance
|-
|Cleansing
|| Andrew Roger Carson
|| 12 May 2012 (UK)
|| Drama
|-
|Clear Lake
|| Mick Paulusma
|| 1 November 2012 (Canada)
|| Drama
|-
|Closure
|| Andrew Golden
|| 17 April 2012 (UK)
|| Comedy
|-
|Cloud Cuckoo Land
|| Matt Dickinson
|| 15 August 2012 (USA)
|| Drama
|-
|Cocktail
|| Homi Adajania
|| 13 July 2012 (UK)
|| Comedy
|-
|Cold Blood
|| Mumtaz Yildirimlar
|| 1 May 2012 (UK)
|| Thriller
|-
|The Comedian
|| Tom Shkolnik
|| October 2012 (UK)
|| Drama
|-
|Common Ground
|| William Brown
|| 
|| Crime
|-
|Community
|| Jason Ford
|| 26 August 2012 (UK)
|| Horror
|-
|Connected
|| Mike Carter
|| 
|| Comedy
|-
|Crushing Snails
|| James Fair
|| 9 September 2012 (UK)
|| Drama
|-
|Crux
|| Bashar Alissa
|| 1 July 2012 (UK)
|| Horror
|-
|Cuckoo
|| Paul Harding
|| 
|| Drama
|-
|The Curse of Ba'al
|| Joe Wheeler
|| 10 February 2014 (UK)
|| Horror
|-
|Daddy Issues
|| Gary J Hewitt
|| 6 April 2012 (UK)
|| Horror
|-
|Dark Journey
|| James White
|| 2012 (UK)
|| Fantasy
|-
|Darkness Into Light
|| David Fairman
|| 
|| Adventure
|-
|Day of the Flowers
|| John Roberts
|| 29 November 2013 (UK)
|| Comedy
|-
|The Days Inbetween
|| Stephan George
|| 9 April 2013 (UK)
|| Comedy
|-
|Days of Infection
|| Ranjeet S. Marwa
|| 17 November 2012 (UK)
|| Horror
|-
|Dead But Not Buried
|| Phil Mulloy
|| 23 March 2012 (France)
|| Animation
|-
|Dead End
|| Nicholas David Lean
|| 27 October 2012 (UK)
|| Thriller
|-
|Dead in France
|| Kris McManus
|| 20 August 2012 (UK)
|| Comedy
|-
|DeadTime
|| Tony Jopia
|| 11 May 2012 (USA)
|| Horror
|-
|Decay
|| Luke Thompson
|| 8 December 2012 (UK)
|| Horror
|-
|Demon
|| Mark Duffield
|| 2012 (UK)
|| Horror
|-
|Demons and Doors
|| Jason Croot
|| 16 March 2012 (UK)
|| Drama
|-
|Dense Fear II: Bloodline
|| Tony Gardner
|| 29 October 2012 (UK)
|| Horror
|-
|Derby Soap Opera
|| Marinella Senatore
|| 20 September 2012 (UK)
|| Drama
|-
|Deviation
|| J.K. Amalou
|| 24 February 2012 (UK)
|| Thriller
|-
|The Devil Made Me Do It
|| Al Carretta
|| 29 September 2012 (UK)
|| Crime
|-
|The Diary of Alice Applebe
|| Jack De La Mare
|| 8 October 2013 (UK)
|| Drama
|-
|Dickens in London
|| Chris Newby
|| 7 February 2012 (UK)
|| Drama
|-
|Different Perspectives
|| Al Brenninkmeijer
|| 28 March 2012 (UK)
|| Romance
|-
|Dig Your Own Grave
|| Tim Cunningham
|| 
|| Comedy
|-
|The Dinner Date
|| Win Edson
|| 26 December 2012 (USA)
|| Comedy
|-
|Discoverdale
|| George Kane
|| 
|| Comedy
|-
|Diversity Digitized: Trapped In A Game
|| 
|| November 2012 (UK)
|| 
|-
|Doctor Faustus
|| Matthew Dunster
|| 24 October 2012 (UK)
|| Comedy
|-
|Dolls Can't Cry
|| Aleksandra Czenczek
|| 18 November 2012 (UK)
|| Drama
|-
|Dom Zauvijek
|| Andi Reiss
|| 
|| War
|-
|The Domino Effect
|| Paula van der Oest
|| 18 October 2012 (Netherlands)
|| Drama
|-
|Double Top
|| Christopher Bolton
|| 
|| Comedy
|-
|Dwellings Close
|| Jorge Cuaik
||
|| Fantasy
|-
|E.V.P.
|| Kevin Duncan
|| 29 October 2012 (UK)
|| Horror
|-
|The Echoes of Empire
|| Mervyn Cumming
|| 11 October 2012 (UK)
|| War
|-
|Electric Man
|| David Barras
|| 29 November 2012 (UK)
|| Action
|-
|The Enigma of Frank Ryan
|| Desmond Bell
|| 21 February 2012 (Ireland)
|| Drama
|-
|Entity
|| Steve Stone
|| 25 October 2012 (UK)
|| Drama
|-
|The Eschatrilogy: Book of the Dead
|| Damian Morter
|| 19 February 2014 (Philippines)
|| Fantasy
|-
|Evidence of Existence
|| Adam El-Sharawy
|| 25 October 2012 (UK)
|| Drama
|-
|Ex Abyssus
|| Jacob Sherwood
|| 31 October 2012 (UK)
|| Fantasy
|-
|Exegesis
|| Jack Delaney
|| 24 March 2012 (UK)
|| Drama
|-
|The Experiment
|| John Symes
|| 1 January 2012 (USA)
|| Horror
|-
|The Facility
|| Ian Clark
|| 23 June 2012 (UK)
|| Horror
|-
|The Farm
|| Paul Juliff
|| 12 September 2012 (UK)
|| Horror
|-
|Fat Cat
|| Michele Fiascaris
|| 12 October 2012 (USA)
|| Action
|-
|Fatboy Slim Live from the Big Beach Boutique
|| Matt Askem
|| 31 August 2012 (UK)
|| Musical
|-
|Fifteen
|| Richard John Taylor
|| 15 June 2012 (UK)
|| Crime
|-
|Final Demand: Action & Martial Arts Thriller
|| Nic Main
|| 1 January 2012 (UK)
|| Action
|-
|Fireman Sam: Heroic Rescue Adventures
|| Steven Kynman
|| August 2012 (USA)
||
|-
|Fireman Sam: Holiday Heroes
|| David Carling
|| October 2012 (USA)
||
|-
|The First Aggregate
|| Darhad Erdenibulag
|| 29 November 2012 (Italy)
|| Drama
|-
|First Time Loser
|| Joe Scott
|| 
|| Drama
|-
|Fish, Chips & Mushy Peas
|| Daniel Smith Rowsey
|| 6 May 2012 (USA)
|| Drama
|-
|Flaneurs
|| Alex Sergeant
|| 
|| Drama
|-
|The Flashing
|| Alex Baggott
|| 
|| Comedy
|-
|The Floating Man
|| Syed Jobair Ahmed
|| 
|| Drama
|-
|Flying Blind
|| Katarzyna Klimkiewicz
|| 12 April 2013 (UK)
|| Drama
|-
|Fog Island
|| Gary Rutherford
|| October 2012 (UK)
|| Horror
|-
|Folie à deux
|| Sean Martin
|| 15 July 2012 (USA)
|| Drama
|-
|For Love
|| Paul Windmill
|| 10 August 2012 (UK)
|| Drama
|-
|The Forbidden Four
|| Thomas Lee Rutter
|| 28 May 2012 (UK)
|| Comedy
|-
|Frail
|| Leslie Rogers
|| 
|| Drama
|-
|Frank
|| Richard Heslop
|| September 2012 (UK)
|| Drama
|-
|Fredonia
|| Matt Shiel
|| 24 November 2012 (UK)
|| Comedy
|-
|Frequency
|| James Lyndon
|| 16 May 2012 (UK)
|| Science fiction
|-
|Friday, in the Evening
|| Simon Ball
|| January 2012 (UK)
||
|-
|From This Day
|| Rick Roberts
|| 12 February 2012 (UK)
|| War
|-
|Fulham Season Review 2011-2012
|| Graham Keyte
|| 11 June 2012 (UK)
|| Sport
|-
|Full Firearms
|| Emily Wardill
|| 2012 (UK)
||
|-
|Futures Past
|| Nick Thomas-Webster
|| 15 July 2012 (UK)
|| Action
|-
|Gabriel in Disguise
|| Helena Astbury
|| 
|| Mystery
|-
|Gain
|| Britmic
|| 3 October 2012 (UK)
|| Horror
|-
|Gangsters, Guns & Zombies
|| Matt Mitchell
|| 2 October 2012 (UK)
|| Comedy
|-
|Girl Shaped Love Drug
|| Simon Powell
|| October 2012 (UK)
|| Drama
|-
|Going Green
|| Mairi Sutherland
|| 
|| Drama
|-
|The Good Man
|| Phil Harrison
|| 
|| Drama
|-
|Gothic Assassins
|| Milos Twilight
|| 13 October 2012 (Spain)
|| Action
|-
|Graders
|| David Hutchison
|| 25 September 2012 (USA)
|| Mystery
|-
|The Great Sherlock Holmes Debate 2
|| Steve Emecz
|| 9 March 2012 (UK)
||
|-
|The Great Sherlock Holmes Debate 3
|| Steve Emecz
|| 4 August 2012 (UK)
||
|-
|Greenwood Manor
|| Lee Rielly
|| 21 September 2012 (UK)
|| Horror
|-
|The Harsh Light of Day
|| Oliver S. Milburn
|| 8 June 2012 (UK)
|| Horror
|-
|Hawk(e): The Movie
|| Phil Baker
|| 25 July 2012 (UK)
|| Comedy
|-
|Heavy Duty
|| Rhys Hayward
|| 2012 (UK)
|| Thriller
|-
|Henry IV Part 1
|| Adam Lee Hamilton
|| May 2012 (UK)
|| Historical
|-
|Heretic
|| Peter Handford
|| 5 November 2012 (UK)
|| Horror
|-
|Herodias
|| David Austin
|| 
|| Adventure
|-
|The Hooligan Wars
|| Paul Tanter
|| 18 February 2013 (Germany)
|| Crime
|-
|The Hour of Living
|| Sebastian Michael
|| 6 June 2012 (Switzerland)
|| Drama
|-
|Housemates
|| Sunny Ache
|| 
|| Mystery
|-
|How the Snowman Came Back to Life
|| Hilary Audus
|| 25 December 2012 (UK)
|| Animation
|-
|How to Make a Film
|| Alan Smithee
|| 1 July 2012 (USA)
|| Thriller
|-
|Hypnoesis
|| Mick Ankri
|| 17 December 2012 (UK)
|| Fantasy
|-
|I Against I
|| Mark Cripps
|| 10 August 2012 (UK)
|| Crime
|-
|I Can't Be Kaspar?
|| Joshua Loftin
|| 1 December 2012 (UK)
|| Drama
|-
|I Can't Stop My Dream
|| Brian McGleenon
|| 
|| Horror
|-
|I Cinna
|| Robert McGroary
|| 2 July 2012 (UK)
|| Drama
|-
|I Superbiker 2 - The Showdown
|| Mark Sloper
|| 21 February 2012 (UK)
|| Sport
|-
|I Work
|| Michael Henry
|| 1 August 2012 (UK)
|| Comedy
|-
|Ibiza My Way or the High Way
|| Hambi Haralambous
|| 1 December 2012 (UK)
||
|-
|If I Were You
|| Joan Carr-Wiggin
|| 10 January 2012 (USA)
|| Comedy
|-
|I'm Nathan
|| Iain Simpson
|| 15 June 2012 (UK)
|| Comedy
|-
|Implementation
|| Ellis Farrell
|| 31 December 2012 (UK)
|| Thriller
|-
|In This Room
|| Richard Swingle
|| 10 May 2012 (UK)
|| Drama
|-
|Inevitability
|| Saranne Bensusan
|| 
|| Drama
|-
|Intrusion
|| Mumtaz Yildirimlar
|| 31 October 2012 (UK)
|| Horror
|-
|The Inventurers
|| Peter Frow
|| December 2012 (UK)
|| Adventure
|-
|Jack Kane Meet Dave
|| Jamie Help
|| 6 June 2012 (UK)
|| Comedy
|-
|Jacob's Hammer
|| Angie Bojtler
|| 
|| Horror
|-
|Jail Caesar
|| Paul Schoolman
|| 3 October 2012 (UK)
|| Drama
|-
|Journey of No Return
|| François Gérard
|| 11 September 2013 (France)
|| Action
|-
|Judy and Jim
|| Ben Fellows
|| 
|| Drama
|-
|Jump
|| Bindu De Stoppani
||  10 January 2012 (Switzerland)
|| Drama
|-
|Just Ate
|| Lisa Downs
|| 
|| Comedy
|-
|Kasabian Live! Live at the O2
|| Charlie Lightening
|| 30 May 2012 (UK)
|| Musical
|-
|Kenneth
|| Peter Anthony Farren
|| 23 March 2013 (UK)
|| Comedy
|-
|Kevin Bridges: The Story Continues...
|| Tom Poole
|| 12 November 2012 (UK)
|| Comedy
|-
|Knight Knight
|| Christina Bucher
|| 24 August 2012 (USA)
|| Comedy
|-
|The Knot
|| Jesse Lawrence
|| 5 October 2012 (UK)
|| Comedy
|-
|Kod Adi: Venüs
|| Tamer Garip
|| 21 December 2012 (Turkey)
|| Action
|-
|Kursk
|| Amanda Boyle
|| 31 July 2012 (UK)
|| Drama
|-
|LA Philharmonic's LIVE with Gustavo Dudamel
|| Gustavo Dudamel
|| 14 March 2012 (UK)
|| Musical
|-
|The Last Road
|| John Wheeler
|| 27 August 2014 (USA)
|| Action
|-
|Late September
|| Jon Sanders
|| 15 June 2012 (UK)
|| Drama
|-
|Latvia
|| Barry Derbyshire
|| 2012 (UK)
|| Drama
|-
|The Legend of the 5ive
|| James P. Weatherall
|| 18 January 2013 (UK)
|| Horror
|-
|Letter to Obama
|| Ayman Mokhtar
|| 
|| Drama
|-
|L'histoire de nos petites morts
|| David Chidlow
|| 
|| Drama
|-
|Life for Rent
|| Sean Orelaja
|| 15 December 2012 (UK)
|| Drama
|-
|Lighter
|| Gary Grant
|| 
|| Drama
|-
|Lilet Never Happened
|| Jacco Groen
|| 10 January 2013 (Netherlands)
|| Drama
|-
|The Limelight
|| Glen Maney
|| 20 April 2012 (UK)
|| Comedy
|-
|Little Big Boy
|| Kim Sønderholm
|| 21 August 2012 (UK)
|| Comedy
|-
|Little District
|| Callum Andrew Johnston
|| 14 January 2012 (UK)
|| Thriller
|-
|Live East Die Young
|| Laura Hypponen
|| 4 October 2012 (UK)
|| Drama
|-
|The Lock In
|| Nigel Horne
|| 8 October 2012 (UK)
|| Musical
|-
|London Stories
|| Ryan Claffey
|| 1 May 2012 (UK)
|| Drama
|-
|The Longest Night
|| Aaron Michael Esmonde
|| 31 October 2012 (UK)
|| Mystery
|-
|Lord Horror: The Dark and Silver Age
|| Gareth Jackson
|| June 2012 (UK)
|| 
|-
|Love & Money
|| Tunji Faronbi
|| 
|| Comedy
|-
|Love Never Dies
|| Brett Sullivan
|| 11 April 2012 (Canada)
|| Drama
|-
|Love Tomorrow
|| Christopher Payne
|| 8 November 2013 (UK)
|| Romance
|-
|Love's Labour's Lost: Performed in British Sign Language
|| Paula Garfield
|| 22 May 2012 (UK)
|| Comedy
|-
|Madam Butterfly 3D
|| Julian Napier
|| 5 March 2012 (UK)
|| Musical
|-
|Magic Boys
|| Róbert Koltai
|| 7 October 2013 (UK)
|| Adventure
|-
|The Making of 'Pusher'''
|| Luis Prieto
|| 11 February 2013 (UK)
|| Action
|-
|The Man Inside|| Dan Turner
|| 27 July 2012 (UK)
|| Crime
|-
|A Mancunian Story|| Craig Quinn
|| 31 August 2012 (UK)
|| Crime
|-
|The Martini Shot|| Richard Britain
|| 27 February 2015 (UK)
|| Drama
|-
|The Mask of Sanity|| Govind Chandran
|| 19 May 2012 (UK)
|| Thriller
|-
|May I Kill U?|| Stuart Urban
|| 11 January 2013 (UK)
|| Comedy
|-
|Mayhem Behind Movies|| Nigel Moran
|| 
|| Comedy
|-
|McCullin|| David Morris
|| 1 January 2013 (UK)
|| Documentary
|-
|The Meeting|| Matthew E Carter
|| 
|| Drama
|-
|Meeting Place|| Jason Croot
|| 22 August 2012 (UK)
|| Drama
|-
|Miracle Grow|| Emma Kinni
|| 10 October 2012 (UK)
|| Comedy
|-
|Modified|| Paul Cotrulia
|| 12 September 2012 (UK)
|| Science fiction
|-
|Money Kills|| Lee Murphy
|| 1 November 2012 (Taiwan)
|| Action
|-
|The Most Fun You Can Have Dying|| Kirstin Marcon
|| 26 April 2012 (New Zealand)
|| Drama
|-
|Mother's Milk|| Gerald Fox
|| 9 November 2012 (UK)
|| Drama
|-
|Mr Bhatti on Chutti|| Karan Razdan
|| 18 May 2012 (UK)
|| Comedy
|-
|Mr Self Destruct|| Adrian Rowe
|| September 2014 (UK)
|| Science fiction
|-
|Mrs Lees and Her Ladies|| Stuart Cadenhead
|| 2012 (UK)
|| Comedy
|-
|Much Ado About Nothing|| Jeremy Herrin
|| 10 October 2012 (UK)
|| Comedy
|-
|A Mug's Game|| Joe McArdle
|| 31 December 2012 (UK)
|| Comedy
|-
|My Brother's Keeper|| Lee Hutcheon
|| 30 November 2012 (USA)
|| Drama
|-
|N.F.A. (No Fixed Abode)|| Steve Rainbow
|| 29 November 2013 (UK)
|| Thriller
|-
|Naachle London|| Neville Raschid
|| 24 February 2012 (UK)
|| Musical
|-
|National Theatre Live: The Curious Incident of the Dog in the Night-Time|| Marianne Elliott
|| 6 September 2012 (UK)
||
|-
|The Naughty Room|| Cosmo Jarvis
|| 2012 (UK)
|| Comedy
|-
|Nekropolis|| Mark Baxter
|| 
|| Science fiction
|-
|Newcastle United 1000 Premier League Goals|| 
|| 22 October 2012 (UK)
|| Sport
|-
|Nice Guy|| Pascal Bergamin
|| 2012 (UK)
|| Crime
|-
|Night Is Day: The Movie|| Fraser Coull
|| 10 September 2012 (UK)
|| Action
|-
|Night of the Living Dead: Resurrection|| James Plumb
|| 30 November 2012 (UK)
|| Horror
|-
|The Nightclub Days|| Declan Reynolds
|| 
|| Comedy
|-
|Nightscape: Dark Reign of Thanatos|| Dom Lenoir
|| 26 September 2012 (USA)
|| Fantasy
|-
|Ninja Shadow Warriors|| John Wate
|| 5 March 2012 (USA)
|| Historical
|-
|No Direction Home|| Juno Jakob
|| 5 November 2012 (UK)
|| Drama
|-
|Noel Gallagher's High Flying Birds Live|| Dick Carruthers
|| 26 February 2012 (UK)
|| Musical
|-
|Not Exactly Inside Man|| Lee Keable
|| 5 March 2012 (UK)
||
|-
|Notes from the Underground|| Barry Bliss
|| 2012 (UK)
|| Drama
|-
|Nothing Beats Being Back: West Ham United Season Review 2011-2012|| Graham Keyte
|| 16 July 2012 (UK)
|| Sport
|-
|Nothing Man|| Jonathan Ashdown
|| 
|| Action
|-
|Nothing to Be Done|| Ross Donald
|| 
|| Drama
|-
|Once Bitten|| Luke Todd
|| 15 May 2012 (UK)
|| Thriller
|-
|Once Upon a Life|| Francesco Scarito
|| 5 July 2012 (UK)
|| Drama
|-
|One Direction: All for One|| Sonia Anderson
|| 13 November 2012 (USA)
|| Biography
|-
|One Week|| Ric Crossley
|| February 2012 (UK)
|| Drama
|-
|Outpost 11|| Anthony Woodley
|| 31 December 2012 (USA)
|| Science fiction
|-
|The Package III: Deadfire|| Sam Richardson
|| 21 December 2012 (UK)
|| Animation
|-
|Parallel Lives|| Peter Ferris
|| 
|| Biography
|-
|Parchhai London|| Salman Malik
|| 1 October 2012 (UK)
|| Thriller
|-
|Paris 60|| Tony Sebastian Ukpo
|| 2 February 2012 (UK)
|| Drama
|-
|The Penguin King|| Tim Allen
|| 24 October 2012 (UK)
|| Adventure
|-
|The Pharmacist|| Patrick von Boetticher
|| 6 July 2012 (UK)
|| Drama
|-
|Piggy|| Kieron Hawkes
|| 4 May 2012 (UK)
|| Thriller
|-
|Playing the Moldovans at Tennis|| Tony Hawks
|| 22 June 2012 (UK)
|| Comedy
|-
|The PoseidonGodofWater20 Movie|| James Barratt
|| 12 July 2012 (UK)
|| Comedy
|-
|The Prisoner|| Mohy Quandour
|| 
|| Drama
|-
|Private Peaceful|| Pat O'Connor
|| 12 October 2012 (UK)
|| Drama
|-
|Psoro|| Wayne Daniells
|| 14 December 2012 (UK)
|| Horror
|-
|Psychotic|| Johnny Johnson
|| 3 March 2015 (USA)
|| Action
|-
|Pustoy dom|| Nurbek Egen
|| June 2012 (Kazakhstan)
|| Drama
|-
|Queen Elizabeth II: The Diamond Celebration|| Alan Byron
|| 26 March 2012 (UK)
|| Biography
|-
|Rain: An Original Musical|| Maxine Evans
|| 
|| Musical
|-
|Red City|| Manos Cizek
|| 5 November 2012 (Greece)
|| Science fiction
|-
|Renga|| Adam Russell
|| 9 March 2012 (USA)
|| Animation
|-
|R/Evolution|| Ben Cole
|| 1 March 2012 (UK)
||
|-
|Rhod Gilbert: The Man with the Flaming Battenberg Tattoo|| Rhod Gilbert
|| 19 November 2012 (UK)
|| Comedy
|-
|Richard Thompson-Live at Celtic Connection|| Richard Thompson
|| 30 January 2012 (UK)
|| Musical
|-
|Riot|| Simon Phillips
|| 1 October 2012 (UK)
|| Crime
|-
|Riot on Redchurch Street|| Trevor Miller
|| 2012 (UK)
|| Crime
|-
|The Rise|| Rowan Athale
|| 20 September 2013 (UK)
|| Crime
|-
|Robbie Williams: Take the Crown Live|| Hamish Hamilton
|| 24 November 2012 (UK)
|| Musical
|-
|Rock N Roll Over|| Enguerran Prieu
|| 25 October 2014 (UK)
|| Musical
|-
|Rosas|| Marinella Senatore
|| 8 September 2012 (UK)
|| Drama
|-
|Sade: Bring Me Home Live|| Sophie Muller
|| 22 May 2012 (USA)
|| Musical
|-
|Sadourni's Butterflies|| Darío Nardi
|| 2013 (Argentina)
|| Drama
|-
|Sapphic Traffic|| Lex Hefner
|| 24 October 2012 (UK)
|| Drama
|-
|Savage Witches|| Daniel Fawcett
|| 21 September 2012 (UK)
|| Fantasy
|-
|Sawney: Flesh of Man|| Ricky Wood
|| 24 August 2012 (UK)
|| Horror
|-
|The Scapegoat|| Charles Sturridge
|| 9 September 2012 (UK)
|| Drama
|-
|Schemata|| Leon Hady
|| 10 October 2012 (UK)
|| Thriller
|-
|Se1: Evan's Baby|| Devron Callender
|| 23 April 2012 (UK)
|| Drama
|-
|The Seasoning House|| Paul Hyett
|| 21 June 2013 (UK)
|| Drama
|-
|A Second Son|| Allistair Mitchell
|| 12 December 2012 (UK)
|| Drama
|-
|Self Same Sky|| William Forster
|| 
|| Drama
|-
|The Secret of Wilson Hill|| Roger Slagle
|| 
|| Action
|-
|Seven Africans|| Tes Noah Asfaw
|| 2012 (UK)
|| Drama
|-
|Sex, Lies & Depravity|| Jason Impey
|| 29 June 2012 (UK)
|| Drama
|-
|The Shadow of Death|| Gav Chuckie Steel
|| 13 May 2012 (UK)
|| Comedy
|-
|Shamrocracy|| Gary Bermingham
|| 
|| Comedy
|-
|She's Dead|| Nick Box
|| 31 October 2012 (UK)
|| Horror
|-
|Shockwave|| Paul Palmer
|| 16 December 2012 (UK)
|| Action
|-
|Simple Things|| Samuel Ashton Hall
|| 
|| Crime
|-
|Slasher House|| Mj Dixon
|| 29 April 2013 (UK)
|| Horror
|-
|Somethings Upstairs|| Tommy Williams
|| 8 October 2012 (UK)
|| Horror
|-
|Songs of Alchemy|| Jan-Willem van den Bosch
|| 2012 (UK)
|| Musical
|-
|Spike Island|| Mat Whitecross
|| 21 June 2013 (UK)
|| Drama
|-
|The Spirit of Albion|| Gary Andrews
|| 1 May 2012 (UK)
|| Musical
|-
|Splash Area|| George Clarke
|| 9 September 2012 (UK)
|| Horror
|-
|Spurs 1972 UEFA Cup Final|| Graham Keyte
|| 27 February 2012 (UK)
|| Sport
|-
|Stags and Hens Live on Stage|| Donika Islami
|| 26 April 2012 (UK)
|| Comedy
|-
|Starlet|| Sean Baker
|| 9 May 2013 (Germany)
|| Drama
|-
|Startled|| Maria Marshall
|| 
|| Drama
|-
|Steven Wilson: Get All You Deserve|| Lasse Hoile
|| 24 September 2012 (UK)
|| Musical
|-
|Street Fight|| Graeme Noble
|| 
|| Action
|-
|Strings|| Rob Savage
|| 
|| Drama
|-
|Stud Life|| Campbell Ex
|| 5 July 2013 (Germany)
|| Drama
|-
|Such is Life|| Stephen Woods
|| 6 November 2012 (UK)
|| Drama
|-
|Sugarplum; I am a GI Baby|| Alan Brown
|| 
||
|-
|Sun Like Star|| Leo Gregory
|| 
|| Comedy
|-
|Sunday|| Geoff Woods
|| 1 October 2012 (UK)
|| Drama
|-
|Sunderland Season Review 2011-2012|| Graham Keyte
|| 11 June 2012 (UK)
|| Sport
|-
|Sunderland Stadium of Light Classic Matches|| 
|| 15 October 2012 (UK)
|| Sport
|-
|Surprise|| Peter Hewitt
|| 
|| Comedy
|-
|Tales of Terror 3|| Jason Impey
|| August 2012 (UK)
|| Horror
|-
|Tash Force|| Michael Booth
|| 19 April 2012 (UK)
|| Comedy
|-
|Tea in a Thunder Cup|| Danny Germansen
|| 
|| Drama
|-
|The Telemachy|| Alexander Nally
|| 4 November 2012 (Greece)
|| Adventure
|-
|Temple Wood: A Quest for Freedom|| Ethan Race
|| 9 December 2012 (UK)
|| Drama
|-
|Terror Telly|| Nick Box
|| 15 November 2012 (UK)
|| Comedy
|-
|They're Coming|| John Tomkins
|| 27 September 2012 (UK)
|| Adventure
|-
|Thomas & Friends: Blue Mountain Mystery|| Greg Tiernan
|| 3 September 2012 (UK)
||
|-
|Thomas & Friends: A Very Thomas Christmas|| Greg Tiernan
|| October 2012 (USA)
||
|-
|Three Degrees|| Lee Battle
|| 
|| Drama
|-
|Three's a Shroud|| Dan Brownlie
|| 
|| Horror
|-
|Throw of a Dice|| Chaand Chazelle
|| 
|| Drama
|-
|Tied in Blood|| Matthew Lawrence
|| 1 February 2012 (USA)
|| Drama
|-
|Titanic|| Kevin Lincoln
|| 2 October 2012 (UK)
|| Adventure
|-
|To the End of the Road|| Gibson Chimozinga
|| 29 September 2012 (UK)
|| Crime
|-
|To Say Goodbye|| Matt Richards
|| 30 September 2013 (UK)
|| Animation
|-
|Together|| Marcus Lee
|| 
|| Drama
|-
|Toothbrush|| Michael McNulty
|| 7 June 2012 (UK)
|| Comedy
|-
|Toothbrush Belfast|| Michael McNulty
|| 7 June 2012 (UK)
|| Romance
|-
|Tottenham Hotspur Rivalries Collection|| 
|| 24 September 2012 (UK)
|| Sport
|-
|Tottenham Hotspur Season Review 2011-2012|| Graham Keyte
|| 11 June 2012 (UK)
|| Sport
|-
|Tough Talk|| Callum Rees
|| 1 October 2012 (UK)
|| Drama
|-
|Towns|| Iain Cash
|| 
|| Drama
|-
|Train to Kandy|| Udana Fonseka
|| 8 June 2012 (Sri Lanka)
|| Crime
|-
|Transcalar Investment Vehicles|| Hilary Koob-Sassen
|| 
|| Animation
|-
|Truth or Dare|| Robert Heath
|| 6 August 2012 (UK)
|| Comedy
|-
|Turn in Your Grave|| Rob Ager
|| 2012 (UK)
|| Horror
|-
|Twisted: The Devil in Her Mind|| Eddie Bammeke
|| 5 November 2012 (UK)
||
|-
|Una noche|| Lucy Mulloy
|| 18 January 2013 (Taiwan)
|| Drama
|-
|Unconditional|| Bryn Higgins
|| 25 June 2012 (UK)
|| Drama
|-
|Venus in Eros|| Takako Imai
|| 20 October 2012 (Japan)
|| Drama
|-
|The Village|| Sam Creamer
|| 15 May 2012 (UK)
|| Comedy
|-
|Villains|| Robbie Moffat
|| 21 May 2012 (France)
|| Crime
|-
|Ward 3|| Saad Abbas
|| 2012 (UK)
|| Horror
|-
|The Warning|| Alexander Williams
|| 21 December 2012 (UK)
|| Horror
|-
|The Wasters|| Sam Mason-Bell
|| 13 May 2012 (UK)
|| Drama
|-
|Waves|| Romina Cortese
|| 
|| Drama
|-
|We Are Going Up - Sheffield Wednesday Season Review 2011-2012|| Graham Keyte
|| 11 June 2012 (UK)
|| Sport
|-
|Welcome to London|| Asad Shan
|| 9 March 2012 (UK)
|| Drama
|-
|Welcome to My Country|| Kristopher Nimbley
|| 9 July 2012 (UK)
|| Comedy
|-
|West Ham United: The Goalscorers|| Graham Keyte
|| 14 October 2012 (UK)
|| Sport
|-
|West Ham United - The Rivalries Collection|| 
|| 6 August 2012 (UK)
|| Sport
|-
|What Is This Film Called Love?|| Mark Cousins
|| 26 June 2012 (UK)
||
|-
|What You Will|| Simon Reade
|| 14 September 2012 (UK)
|| Drama
|-
|Whatever Happened to Pete Blaggit?|| Mark Jeavons
|| 26 March 2012 (UK)
|| Comedy
|-
|When the Lights Went Out|| Pat Holden
|| 14 September 2012 (UK)
|| Horror
|-
|Where It Flows Out Into the Plains|| Hiroshi Sunairi
|| August 2012 (India)
|| Adventure
|-
|Who We Are|| Peter Harris-Rogers
|| 
|| Drama
|-
|Wide Boyz|| Chris Alstrin
|| 15 November 2012 (USA)
|| Sport
|-
|Wimbledon 2012 Official Film|| Cathy Jones
|| 1 August 2012 (UK)
|| Sport
|-
|The Wish|| Marcel Mandu
|| 
|| Drama
|-
|Woolwich Boys|| Anthony Abuah
|| 15 February 2012 (UK)
|| Drama
|-
|Wraith|| Edward Botham
|| 20 September 2012 (UK)
|| Thriller
|-
|Written in Dust|| Gareth Rees
|| 
|| Crime
|-
|A Year and a Day|| Jacques Cousineau
|| 4 September 2012 (UK)
|| Drama
|-
|Youth of Today|| Ross McKenzie
|| 10 June 2012 (UK)
|| Drama
|-
|The Zigzag Kid|| Vincent Bal
|| 3 October 2012 (Netherlands)
|| Adventure
|-
|Zombie Mutation|| Adam A. Park
|| 4 November 2012 (UK)
|| Horror
|}

Co-productions

Of the 133 major British releases of 2012, 59 were co-productions with at least one other country. As with other years, the largest number of co-productions were made with the United States, with 28 films. However, unlike in other years, these did not primarily consist of American-led releases with British technical contributions (although these did exist, most notably in the form of Prometheus and The Dark Knight Rises), but British-led films backed by American funding, the most notable of which are Les Misérables, Skyfall and The Pirates! In an Adventure with Scientists!.

Highest-grossing films

Listed here are the highest grossing British films of 2012, with their total earnings listed in British pound sterling. It includes films released in previous years that made money in 2012, particularly those that had minor releases in 2011 but their main releases in 2012.

Critical reception

Listed here are the top ten best and worst British films of those released in 2012, and listed above as major releases, as per the review aggregation websites Rotten Tomatoes and Metacritic. The critical and scores for Rotten Tomatoes are out of a maximum score of 100, as is the critical score for Metacritic.

Rotten Tomatoes

Metacritic

British award winners

Listed here are the British winners and nominees at the five most prestigious film award ceremonies in the English-speaking world: the Academy Awards, British Academy Film Awards, Critics' Choice Awards, Golden Globe Awards and Screen Actors Guild Awards, that were held during 2012, celebrating the best films of 2011. The British nominations were led by Tinker Tailor Soldier Spy, War Horse, My Week with Marilyn and The Iron Lady, though they did not go on to win many of them, losing most notably to The Artist (from France) and Hugo (from the United States).

Academy Awards
The 84th Academy Awards honoring the best films of 2011 were held on 26 February 2012.

British winners:

 The Iron Lady (Best Actress, Best Makeup)
 The Shore (Best Live Action Short Film)
 John Midgley (Best Sound Mixing) - Hugo Mark Coulier (Best Makeup) - The Iron Lady Oorlagh George (Best Live Action Short Film) - The Shore Terry George (Best Live Action Short Film) - The ShoreBritish nominations:

 Albert Nobbs (Best Actress, Best Supporting Actress, Best Makeup)
 A Morning Stroll (Best Animated Short Film)
 Anonymous (Best Costume Design)
 Chico and Rita (Best Animated Feature)
 Harry Potter and the Deathly Hallows – Part 2 (Best Art Direction, Best Makeup, Best Visual Effects)
 If a Tree Falls: A Story of the Earth Liberation Front (Best Documentary – Feature)
 Jane Eyre (Best Costume Design)
 My Week with Marilyn (Best Actress)
 Pina (Best Documentary – Feature)
 Tinker Tailor Soldier Spy (Best Actor, Best Adapted Screenplay, Best Original Score)
 War Horse (Best Film, Best Original Score, Best Sound Editing, Best Sound Mixing, Best Art Direction, Best Cinematography)
 W.E. (Best Costume Design)
 Andy Nelson (Best Sound Mixing) - War Horse Bridget O'Connor (Best Adapted Screenplay) - Tinker Tailor Soldier Spy David Vickery (Best Visual Effects) - Harry Potter and the Deathly Hallows – Part 2 Gary Oldman (Best Actor) - Tinker Tailor Soldier Spy Graham King (Best Film) - Hugo Grant Orchard (Best Animated Short Film) - A Morning Stroll Janet McTeer (Best Supporting Actress) - Albert Nobbs John Richardson (Best Visual Effects) - Harry Potter and the Deathly Hallows – Part 2 Michael O'Connor (Best Costume Design) - Jane Eyre Nick Dudman (Best Makeup) - Harry Potter and the Deathly Hallows – Part 2 Peter Straughan (Best Adapted Screenplay) - Tinker Tailor Soldier Spy Sandy Powell (Best Costume Design) - Hugo Stephenie McMillan (Best Art Direction) - Harry Potter and the Deathly Hallows – Part 2 Stuart Craig (Best Art Direction) - Harry Potter and the Deathly Hallows – Part 2British Academy Film Awards
The 65th British Academy Film Awards were held on 12 February 2012.

British winners:

 Harry Potter and the Deathly Hallows – Part 2 (Best Special Visual Effects)
 Senna (Best Documentary, Best Editing)
 The Iron Lady (Best Actress in a Leading Role)
 Tinker Tailor Soldier Spy (Best Adapted Screenplay, Outstanding British Film)
 Tyrannosaur (Outstanding Debut by a British Writer, Director or Producer)
 Adam Deacon (Orange Rising Star Award)
 Asif Kapadia (Best Documentary) - Senna Bridget O'Connor (Best Adapted Screenplay) - Tinker Tailor Soldier Spy David Vickery (Best Special Visual Effects) - Harry Potter and the Deathly Hallows – Part 2 Diarmid Scrimshaw (Outstanding Debut by a British Writer, Director or Producer) - Tyrannosaur John Hurt (Outstanding British Contribution to Cinema)
 John Richardson (Best Special Visual Effects) - Harry Potter and the Deathly Hallows – Part 2 Paddy Considine (Outstanding Debut by a British Writer, Director or Producer) - Tyrannosaur Peter Straughan (Best Adapted Screenplay) - Tinker Tailor Soldier SpyBritish nominations:

 Arthur Christmas (Best Animated Film)
 Attack the Block (Outstanding Debut by a British Writer, Director or Producer)
 Black Pond (Outstanding Debut by a British Writer, Director or Producer)
 Coriolanus (Outstanding Debut by a British Writer, Director or Producer)
 Harry Potter and the Deathly Hallows – Part 2 (Best Sound, Best Production Design, Best Makeup and Hair)
 Jane Eyre (Best Costume Design)
 My Week with Marilyn (Best Actress in a Leading Role, Best Actor in a Supporting Role, Best Actress in a Supporting Role, Outstanding British Film, Best Costume Design, Best Makeup and Hair)
 Pina (Best Film Not in the English Language)
 Project Nim (Best Documentary)
 Senna (Outstanding British Film)
 Shame (Best Actor in a Leading Role, Outstanding British Film)
 Submarine (Outstanding Debut by a British Writer, Director or Producer)
 The Iron Lady (Best Actor in a Supporting Role, Best Original Screenplay, Best Makeup and Hair)
 Tinker Tailor Soldier Spy (Best Film, Best Director, Best Actor in a Leading Role, Best Cinematography, Best Original Music, Best Sound, Best Production Design, Best Costume Design, Best Editing)
 War Horse (Best Cinematography, Best Original Music, Best Sound, Best Production Design, Best Special Visual Effects)
 We Need to Talk About Kevin (Best Director, Best Actress in a Leading Role, Outstanding British Film)
 Abi Morgan (Best Original Screenplay) - The Iron Lady Atticus Ross (Best Original Music) - The Girl with the Dragon Tattoo Carey Mulligan (Best Actress in a Supporting Role) - Drive Eddie Redmayne (Orange Rising Star Award)
 Gary Oldman (Best Actor in a Leading Role) - Tinker Tailor Soldier Spy Jacqueline Durran (Best Costume Design) - Tinker Tailor Soldier Spy James Marsh (Best Documentary) - Project Nim Jenny Shircore (Best Makeup and Hair) - My Week with Marilyn Jim Broadbent (Best Actor in a Supporting Role) - The Iron Lady Joe Cornish (Outstanding Debut by a British Writer, Director or Producer) - Attack the Block John Michael McDonagh (Best Original Screenplay) - The Guard Judi Dench (Best Actress in a Supporting Role) - My Week with Marilyn Kenneth Branagh (Best Actor in a Supporting Role) - My Week with Marilyn Lynne Ramsay (Best Director) - We Need to Talk About Kevin Michael O'Connor (Best Costume Design) - Jane Eyre Ralph Fiennes (Outstanding Debut by a British Writer, Director or Producer) - Coriolanus Richard Ayoade (Outstanding Debut by a British Writer, Director or Producer) - Submarine Sandy Powell (Best Costume Design) - Hugo Sarah Brocklehurst (Outstanding Debut by a British Writer, Director or Producer) - Black Pond Stephenie McMillan (Best Production Design) - Harry Potter and the Deathly Hallows – Part 2 Stuart Craig (Best Production Design) - Harry Potter and the Deathly Hallows – Part 2 Tilda Swinton (Best Actress in a Leading Role) - We Need to Talk About Kevin Tom Hiddleston (Orange Rising Star Award)
 Tom Kingsley (Outstanding Debut by a British Writer, Director or Producer) - Black Pond Will Sharpe (Outstanding Debut by a British Writer, Director or Producer) - Black PondCritics' Choice Awards
The 17th Critics' Choice Awards were held on 12 January 2012.

British winners:

 Harry Potter and the Deathly Hallows – Part 2 (Best Makeup, Best Sound)
 War Horse (Best Cinematography)

British nominations:

 Albert Nobbs (Best Makeup)
 Arthur Christmas (Best Animated Feature)
 Cave of Forgotten Dreams (Best Documentary Feature)
 Gnomeo & Juliet (Best Song)
 Hanna (Best Young Actor/Actress, Best Action Movie)
 Harry Potter and the Deathly Hallows – Part 2 (Best Art Direction, Best Visual Effects)
 Jane Eyre (Best Costume Design)
 My Week with Marilyn (Best Actress, Best Supporting Actor, Best Costume Design, Best Makeup)
 Project Nim (Best Documentary Feature)
 Shame (Best Actor, Best Supporting Actress)
 The Iron Lady (Best Actress, Best Makeup)
 War Horse (Best Picture, Best Director, Best Art Direction, Best Editing, Best Sound, Best Score)
 We Need to Talk About Kevin (Best Actress, Best Young Actor/Actress)
 Andy Serkis (Best Supporting Actor) - Rise of the Planet of the Apes Asa Butterfield (Best Young Actor/Actress) - Hugo Atticus Ross (Best Score) - The Girl with the Dragon Tattoo Bernie Taupin (Best Song) - Gnomeo & Juliet Carey Mulligan (Best Supporting Actress) - Shame Elton John (Best Song) - Gnomeo & Juliet Kenneth Branagh (Best Supporting Actor) - My Week with Marilyn Michael O'Connor (Best Costume Design) - Jane Eyre Sandy Powell (Best Costume Design) - Hugo Stephen Daldry (Best Director) - Extremely Loud and Incredibly Close Stephenie McMillan (Best Art Direction) - Harry Potter and the Deathly Hallows – Part 2 Stuart Craig (Best Art Direction) - Harry Potter and the Deathly Hallows – Part 2 Tilda Swinton (Best Actress) - We Need to Talk About KevinGolden Globe Awards
The 69th Golden Globe Awards were held on 15 January 2012.

British winners:

 My Week with Marilyn (Best Actress - Motion Picture Musical or Comedy)
 The Iron Lady (Best Actress - Motion Picture Drama)
 W.E. (Best Original Song)

British nominations:

 A Dangerous Method (Best Supporting Actor)
 Albert Nobbs (Best Actress - Motion Picture Drama, Best Supporting Actress, Best Original Song)
 Arthur Christmas (Best Animated Feature Film)
 Gnomeo & Juliet (Best Original Song)
 My Week with Marilyn (Best Motion Picture – Musical or Comedy, Best Supporting Actor)
 Shame (Best Actor - Motion Picture Drama)
 War Horse (Best Motion Picture – Drama, Best Original Score)
 W.E. (Best Original Score)
 We Need to Talk About Kevin (Best Actress - Motion Picture Drama)
 Atticus Ross (Best Original Score) - The Girl with the Dragon Tattoo Bernie Taupin (Best Original Song) - Gnomeo & Juliet Elton John (Best Original Song) - Gnomeo & Juliet Kate Winslet (Best Actress - Motion Picture Musical or Comedy) - Carnage Kenneth Branagh (Best Supporting Actor) - My Week with Marilyn Janet McTeer (Best Supporting Actress) - Albert Nobbs Tilda Swinton (Best Actress - Motion Picture Drama) - We Need to Talk About KevinScreen Actors Guild Awards
The 18th Screen Actors Guild Awards were held on 29 January 2012.

British winners:

 Harry Potter and the Deathly Hallows – Part 2 (Outstanding Performance by a Stunt Ensemble in a Motion Picture)

British nominations:

 Albert Nobbs (Outstanding Performance by a Female Actor in a Leading Role, Outstanding Performance by a Female Actor in a Supporting Role)
 My Week with Marilyn (Outstanding Performance by a Female Actor in a Leading Role, Outstanding Performance by a Male Actor in a Supporting Role)
 The Iron Lady (Outstanding Performance by a Female Actor in a Leading Role)
 X-Men: First Class (Outstanding Performance by a Stunt Ensemble in a Motion Picture)
 We Need to Talk About Kevin (Outstanding Performance by a Female Actor in a Leading Role)
 Janet McTeer (Outstanding Performance by a Female Actor in a Supporting Role) - Albert Nobbs Kenneth Branagh (Outstanding Performance by a Male Actor in a Supporting Role) - My Week with Marilyn Matt Lucas (Outstanding Performance by a Cast in a Motion Picture) - Bridesmaids Michael Sheen (Outstanding Performance by a Cast in a Motion Picture) - Midnight in Paris Tilda Swinton (Outstanding Performance by a Female Actor in a Leading Role) - We Need to Talk About Kevin''

Notable deaths

See also

 2012 in film
 2012 in British music
 2012 in British radio
 2012 in British television
 2012 in the United Kingdom
 List of 2012 box office number-one films in the United Kingdom
 List of British films of 2011
 List of British films of 2013

References

External links
 

2012
Films
Lists of 2012 films by country or language